Carlo Moscatiello (1650–1739) was an Italian painter of the Baroque period, active near his natal city of Naples. He was active in quadratura.

References

1650 births
1739 deaths
17th-century Neapolitan people
17th-century Italian painters
Italian male painters
18th-century Italian painters
Painters from Naples
Italian Baroque painters
Quadratura painters
18th-century Neapolitan people
18th-century Italian male artists